Cyril Bailey, CBE, FBA (13 April 1871 – 5 December 1957) was an English classicist. He was a fellow and tutor at Balliol College, Oxford, from 1902 to 1939.

Early life 
He was born on 13 April 1871 to Alfred Bailey, a barrister and legal scholar, and his wife Fanny Margaret, née Coles, a merchant's daughter. His godfather (and cousin) was the banker and classical scholar Sir Walter Leaf. Cyril attended St Paul's School in London, before studying classics at Balliol College, Oxford (1890–94); he won the Craven and Hertford scholarships.

Academic career and honours 
After graduating with a first-class degree, Bailey was elected a fellow and tutor at Exeter College, Oxford, in 1894. He left there in 1902, when he returned to Balliol as a fellow. He remained there for thirty seven years before retiring in 1939. A popular classics tutor and highly regarded lecturer, Bailey was a prominent figure in the life of his college. He epitomised a type of scholar, "of first-rate ability and international reputation who preferred not to seek promotion, titles, or even relief from the duties of teaching, and who were content with the position of tutor at an Oxford college, lavishing much of their time and energy on their pupils."

Bailey also served as the Public Orator for the University of Oxford between 1932 and 1939, chairman of the council of Lady Margaret Hall, Oxford, from 1921 to 1939, and as a delegate of Oxford University Press from 1921 to 1946, in the latter role being involved in the production of the Oxford Latin Dictionary which was published in 1968. His own research focused on the classical philosophers Lucretius and Epicurus.

Alongside receiving five honorary doctorates, Bailey gave the Sather Lectures at the University of California in 1932 and was elected a fellow of the British Academy the next year. He was appointed a Commander of the Order of the British Empire in 1939 for his work as chairman of the Oxford Youth Advisory Committee. He died on 5 December 1957 and was survived by his wife, Gemma (daughter of the historian and bishop Mandell Creighton), who had attended the University of Oxford herself, and produced a history of Lady Margaret Hall in 1923. They had four children. Their third child, Rachel Moss (with her husband the Very Rev. Basil Moss), played an important role in liberalising Church of England views on sexuality; she edited God's Yes to Sexuality (1981).

Selected works 
 Lvcreti de Rervm Natvra Libri Sex, Oxford Classical Texts (Oxford: Clarendon Press, 1900; 2nd ed., 1922).
 The Religion of Ancient Rome (London: A. Constable & Co, 1907).
 Lucretius on the Nature of Things (Oxford: Clarendon Press, 1910).
 P. Ovidi Nasonis Fastorum Liber III (Oxford: Clarendon Press, 1921).
 The Clouds of Aristophanes, Clarendon Series of Latin and Greek Authors (Oxford: Clarendon Press, 1921).
 The Legacy of Rome (Oxford: Clarendon Press, 1923).
 Epicurus: The Extant Remains (Oxford: Clarendon Press, 1926).
 (editor) Mind of Rome (Oxford: Clarendon Press, 1926).
 The Greek Atomists and Epicurus (Oxford: Clarendon Press, 1928).
 Phases in the Religion of Ancient Rome (Oxford: Oxford University Press, 1932).
 Religion in Virgil (Oxford: Clarendon Press, 1935).
 Francis Fortescue Urquhart: A Memoir (London: Macmillan and Co., 1936).
 De Rerum Natura Libri Sex, 3 vols. (Oxford: Clarendon Press, 1947).
 Hugh Percy Allen (London: Oxford University Press, 1948).
 Lucretius (London: Geoffrey Cumberlege, 1949).
 A Short History of the Balliol Boys' Club, 1907–1950 (Oxford: Oxford University Press, 1950).

Further reading 
 Walter Oakeshott, "Cyril Bailey, 1871–1958", Proceedings of the British Academy, vol. 46 (1960), pp. 295–308

References 

1871 births
1957 deaths
English classical scholars
Alumni of Balliol College, Oxford
Fellows of Exeter College, Oxford
Fellows of Balliol College, Oxford
Public Orators of the University of Oxford
Commanders of the Order of the British Empire
Fellows of the British Academy
People educated at St Paul's School, London
Presidents of the Classical Association